Badminton at the 2011 All-Africa Games in Maputo, Mozambique was held between September 6–12, 2011.

Venue
This competition was held at the Escola Josina Machel, in Maputo, Mozambique.

Medal summary
The tables below gives an overview of the medal table and medal result at the 2011 All-Africa Games.

Medal table

Results

References
Badminton All-Africa Games website

External links
 Men's singles result
 Women's singles result
 Men's doubles result
 Women's doubles result
 Mixed doubles result
 Team result
 Individual Result at www.tournamentsoftware.com

2011 All-Africa Games
All-Africa Games
2011
All-Africa Games